In mathematics, a holomorphic vector bundle is a complex vector bundle over a complex manifold  such that the total space  is a complex manifold and the projection map  is holomorphic. Fundamental examples are the holomorphic tangent bundle of a complex manifold, and its dual, the holomorphic cotangent bundle. A holomorphic line bundle is a rank one holomorphic vector bundle.

By Serre's GAGA, the category of holomorphic vector bundles on a smooth complex projective variety X (viewed as a complex manifold) is equivalent to the category of algebraic vector bundles (i.e., locally free sheaves of finite rank) on X.

Definition through trivialization
Specifically, one requires that the trivialization maps

are biholomorphic maps. This is equivalent to requiring that the transition functions

are holomorphic maps. The holomorphic structure on the tangent bundle of a complex manifold is guaranteed by the remark that the derivative (in the appropriate sense) of a vector-valued holomorphic function is itself holomorphic.

The sheaf of holomorphic sections
Let  be a holomorphic vector bundle.

Such a sheaf is always locally free of the same rank as the rank of the vector bundle. If  is the trivial line bundle  then this sheaf coincides with the structure sheaf  of the complex manifold .

Basic Examples 
There are line bundles  over  whose global sections correspond to homogeneous polynomials of degree  (for  a positive integer). In particular,  corresponds to the trivial line bundle. If we take the covering  then we can find charts  defined byWe can construct transition functions  defined byNow, if we consider the trivial bundle  we can form induced transition functions . If we use the coordinate  on the fiber, then we can form transition functionsfor any integer . Each of these are associated with a line bundle . Since vector bundles necessarily pull back, any holomorphic submanifold  has an associated line bundle , sometimes denoted .

Dolbeault operators

Suppose  is a holomorphic vector bundle. Then there is a distinguished operator  defined as follows.
Define an operator locally by

where  is the regular Cauchy–Riemann operator of the base manifold.

because the transition functions are holomorphic. This leads to the following definition: A Dolbeault operator on a smooth complex vector bundle  is an -linear operator

such that

(Cauchy–Riemann condition) ,

.

By an application of the Newlander–Nirenberg theorem, one obtains a converse to the construction of the Dolbeault operator of a holomorphic bundle:

Theorem: Given a Dolbeault operator  on a smooth complex vector bundle , there is a unique holomorphic structure on  such that  is the associated Dolbeault operator as constructed above.
With respect to the holomorphic structure induced by a Dolbeault operator , a smooth section  is holomorphic if and only if . This is similar morally to the definition of a smooth or complex manifold as a ringed space. Namely, it is enough to specify which functions on a topological manifold are smooth or complex, in order to imbue it with a smooth or complex structure.

Dolbeault operator has local inverse in terms of homotopy operator.

The sheaves of forms with values in a holomorphic vector bundle
If  denotes the sheaf of  differential forms of type , then the sheaf of type  forms with values in  can be defined as the tensor product

These sheaves are fine, meaning that they admit partitions of unity.
A fundamental distinction between smooth and holomorphic vector bundles is that in the latter, there is a canonical differential operator, given by the Dolbeault operator defined above:

Cohomology of holomorphic vector bundles

In particular, we have 
 
For the group structure, see also Baer sum as well as sheaf extension.

By Dolbeault's theorem, this sheaf cohomology can alternatively be described as the cohomology of the chain complex defined by the sheaves of forms with values in the holomorphic bundle . Namely we have

The Picard group
In the context of complex differential geometry, the Picard group  of the complex manifold  is the group of isomorphism classes of holomorphic line bundles with group law given by tensor product and inversion given by dualization. It can be equivalently defined as the first cohomology group  of the sheaf of non-vanishing holomorphic functions.

Hermitian metrics on a holomorphic vector bundle 

Let E be a holomorphic vector bundle on a complex manifold M and suppose there is a hermitian metric on E; that is, fibers Ex are equipped with inner products <·,·> that vary smoothly. Then there exists a unique connection ∇ on E that is compatible with both complex structure and metric structure, called the Chern connection; that is, ∇ is a connection such that
(1) For any smooth sections s of E,  where π0,1 takes the (0, 1)-component of an E-valued 1-form.
(2) For any smooth sections s, t of E and a vector field X on M,

Indeed, if u = (e1, …, en) is a holomorphic frame, then let  and define ωu by the equation , which we write more simply as:

If u' = ug is another frame with a holomorphic change of basis g, then

and so ω is indeed a connection form, giving rise to ∇ by ∇s = ds + ω · s. Now, since ,

That is, ∇ is compatible with metric structure.

Let  be the curvature form of ∇. Since  squares to zero by the definition of a Dolbeault operator, Ω has no (0, 2)-component and since Ω is easily shown to be skew-hermitian, it also has no (2, 0)-component. Consequently, Ω is a (1, 1)-form given by

The curvature Ω appears prominently in the vanishing theorems for higher cohomology of holomorphic vector bundles; e.g., Kodaira's vanishing theorem and Nakano's vanishing theorem.

Notes

References

See also 
Birkhoff–Grothendieck theorem
Quillen metric
Serre duality

External links 
Splitting principle for holomorphic vector bundles

Vector bundles
Complex manifolds